Peroz (Middle Persian: , Gupta script:  Pi-ro-ysa "The victorious", ruled circa 350-360 CE), was according to modern scholarship an early Kidarite ruler in Gandhara, right after the end of Kushano-Sasanians.

Rule
The rule of the Kushano-Sasanians ended in the mid-4th century CE, when they lost their territories to the invading Kidarites Huns. 

Peroz was a successor of the first Kidarite ruler Kirada, and the immediate predecessor of the famous Kidarite ruler Kidara. He was previously thought to be one of the last of the Kushano-Sasanids Kushanshas rulers. 

He minted his own coinage and used the title of Kushansha, ie "Kings of the Kushans".

Siege of Amida (359 CE)
Historian Khodadad Rezakhani suggests that Peroz was at the Siege of Amida in 359 CE, where a Kidarite army under Grumbates is known to have supported the Sasanian army of Shapur II in besieging the city held by the Romans. In his account of the siege, Ammianus Marcellinus describes in detail the costume, and in particular the headgear of one of the besieging rulers:

This ruler is traditionally held to be Shapur II, although Ammanus Marcellinus doesn't expressly say so, and Shapur's traditional headgear, a crenellated crown, is very different. The headgear with ram's horn would rather correspond to that of Peroz as seen on many of his coins in the Sasanian style.  Ammianus Marcellinus also mentions that the king, whom he assumes to be Shapur, was called "Saansaan" and "Pirosen" by the Persians, which could actually refer to "Šāhanšāh Pērōz", the ruler of the eastern Hunnic tribes (Chionites, Gelani, and Sagistani).

Coinage in the style of the Kushano-Sasanians
Besides his coins in the Kushan style, Peroz issues silver and gold coinage in the Sasanian style, in which he often retains the name of Kushano-Sasanian ruler Varahran I, but in which Varahran is shown wearing a characteristic Sasanian headgear with the addition of two ram horns.

References

Sources 
 
 
 
 
  
 

3rd-century monarchs in Asia
3rd-century Iranian people